Latrobe is a city in Westmoreland County, Pennsylvania, United States. The population was 8,060 as of the 2020 census. A part of the Pittsburgh metropolitan area, it is located near Pennsylvania's scenic Chestnut Ridge. Latrobe was incorporated as a borough in 1854, and as a city in 1999. The current mayor is Rosemarie M. Wolford.

Latrobe is the home of the Latrobe Brewery (the original brewer of Rolling Rock beer). Latrobe was the birthplace and childhood home of children's television personality Fred Rogers as well as golfer Arnold Palmer. The banana split was invented there by David Strickler in 1904. Latrobe is also home to the training camp of the Pittsburgh Steelers. Latrobe was long recognized as the site of the first professional American football game in 1895 until research found an 1892 game with paid players.

History 
In 1852, Oliver Barnes (a civil engineer for the Pennsylvania Railroad) laid out the plans for the community that was incorporated in 1854 as the Borough of Latrobe. Barnes named the town for his best friend and college classmate, Benjamin Latrobe, who was a civil engineer for the B&O Railroad. (His father, Benjamin Henry Latrobe, was the architect who rebuilt the United States Capitol in Washington, D.C., after the War of 1812.)

Its location along the route of the Pennsylvania Railroad helped Latrobe develop into a significant industrial hub. Latrobe was also served by the Ligonier Valley Railroad from 1877 to 1952.

In 1904, the banana split was invented in Latrobe by David Evans Strickler at the pharmacy that later became named Strickler's Drug Store.

Two interurban (long-distance trolley) lines served Latrobe:
 The Westmoreland County Railway Company connected Latrobe to Derry and operated from 1904 to 1932.
 The Latrobe Street Railway Company connected Latrobe to Kingston and began operations in 1900. This line was purchased by West Penn Railways, which eventually linked it with its network running through Youngstown, Pleasant Unity, and eventually to Greensburg and Uniontown. Service ceased in 1952.

Latrobe has two sites on the National Register of Historic Places within its city boundaries:
 Pennsylvania Railroad Station at Latrobe (325 McKinley Avenue): This station was built by the Pennsylvania Railroad in 1903.
 Citizens National Bank of Latrobe (816 Ligonier Street, at Main Street): This was previously known as the Mellon Bank Building. This six-story, 1926 structure was designed by the Greensburg firm of Batholomew and Smith.

The former Fort Sloan, a small fortress established by the British settlers in the 1700s, is now a private residence, situated on the corner of Cedar St. and Raymond Ave.

Early professional football team 

From 1895 until 1909, Latrobe was the home of the Latrobe Athletic Association, one of the earliest professional football teams. The team's quarterback, John Brallier, became the first football player to admit playing for money. In 1895, he accepted $10 and expenses to play for Latrobe in a 12–0 victory over the Jeannette Athletic Club. Brallier was thought to be the first professional football player, until the 1960s. Then, documents surfaced showing that Pudge Heffelfinger, a former three-time All-American from Yale, was employed to play guard for the Allegheny Athletic Association three years earlier. In 1897, Latrobe was the first football team to play a full season with a team composed entirely of professional players. In 1898, Latrobe and two players from their rivals, the Greensburg Athletic Association, formed the first professional football all-star team for a game against the Duquesne Country and Athletic Club, to be played at Pittsburgh's Exposition Park. Duquesne went on to win the game 16–0. On November 18, 1905, Latrobe defeated the Canton Bulldogs, which later became a founding member, and two-time champion, of the National Football League, 6–0.

Aside from Brallier, the Latrobe Athletic Association included several of the era's top players, such as Ed Abbaticchio, Charles Barney, Alf Bull, Jack Gass, Walter Okeson, Harry Ryan, Doggie Trenchard, and Eddie Wood, and manager Dave Berry.

Brewing 
The Latrobe Brewing Company, founded in 1939, was one of the largest breweries in the United States and the maker of Rolling Rock beer.

In May 2006, Anheuser-Busch purchased the Rolling Rock brands, but not the brewery. In June 2006, City Brewing Company from LaCrosse, Wisconsin, entered into negotiations to buy the brewery. In September 2006, City Brewing Company agreed to purchase the brewery, and they licensed it to the Boston Beer Company in April 2007 as a satellite brewery to produce Samuel Adams beers. Sam Adams production did not last long. The plant is currently brewing Iron City Beer under contract. In addition, Duquesne Bottling Company has brewed the revived Duquesne Beer, "The Prince of Pilseners", at the Latrobe plant.

Mining 
Coal mining was once an important industry in Westmoreland County. While mining activity has largely ceased, most of the city of Latrobe lies in a zone where abandoned underground mines are prevalent, according to a March 1, 2022 article in The Latrobe Bulletin. In 2017, a home in the city's Cramer Heights neighborhood started to collapse after its foundation shifted. The house was condemned and eventually had to be torn down. After this incident, the Pennsylvania Department of Environmental Protection urged Latrobe residents to research whether their properties are undermined and consider applying for mine subsidence insurance.

Geography 
Latrobe is located at  (40.314940, -79.381171). It has a hot-summer humid continental climate (Dfa) and average monthly temperatures range from 28.9 °F in January to 72.0 °F in July.

Surrounding neighborhoods
Latrobe shares borders with the townships of Derry to the north, northwest, east, and southeast, and Unity to the west and southwest.

Demographics

As of the census of 2010,  8,338 people, 3,786 households, and 2,458 families resided in the city. The population density was 3,913.6 people per square mile (1,509.8/km). The 4,258 housing units averaged 1,852.8 per square mile (714.8/km). The racial makeup of the city was 98.78% White, 0.32% African American, 0.08% Native American, 0.44% Asian, 0.07% from other races, and 0.31% from two or more races. Hispanics or Latinos of any race were 0.37% of the population.

Of 3,786 households, 26.0% had children under the age of 18 living with them, 48.1% were married couples living together, 11.0% had a female householder with no husband present, and 38.0% were not families. About 34.1% of all households were made up of individuals, and 17.9% had someone living alone who was 65 years of age or older. The average household size was 2.22 and the average family size was 2.86.

In the city, the population was distribute as 1,730 persons under the age of 18, 429 persons from 20 to 24, 2583 persons from 25 to 49, 1780 persons from 50 to 64, and 1614 persons who were 65 years of age or older. The median age was 42 years. For every 100 females, there were 88.0 males. For every 100 females age 18 and over, there were 83.2 males.

The median income for a household in the city was $33,268, and for a family was $42,168. Males had a median income of $31,802 versus $22,227 for females. The per capita income for the city was $18,208. About 6.5% of families and 9.4% of the population were below the poverty line, including 9.2% of those under age 18 and 7.6% of those age 65 or over.

Federally, Latrobe is part of Pennsylvania's 14th congressional district.

Media 

Latrobe is part of the Pittsburgh television market. Only one Johnstown-Altoona television station WJAC-TV can be received in Latrobe.

Transportation 
 Arnold Palmer Regional Airport (formerly known as Westmoreland County Airport)
 Latrobe (Amtrak station)
 Westmoreland Transit Daily runs locally and commuter runs to Pittsburgh and Johnstown

Notable people 
 Mary Temple Bayard (1853-1916), American writer, journalist
 John Brallier (1876-1960), first openly paid professional football player and the first star of the professional game. 
 Victory Brinker, an opera singer who achieved prominence at the age of nine
 Walt Corey, National Football League player and coach
 Keith Ferrazzi, author and entrepreneur
 Dennis Ferry, trumpeter for Orchestre de la Suisse Romande
 Gregory S. Forbes, meteorologist and severe weather expert for the Weather Channel
 Hanna Green, track and field runner
 Kevin Guskiewicz, Chancellor of the University of North Carolina at Chapel Hill
 Francis J. Harvey, United States Secretary of the Army
 Daniel Lentz, classical and electronic music composer
 Chris Lightcap, jazz bassist
 Jackie Mason, comedian and actor after serving as a rabbi in Latrobe
 Arnold Palmer, iconic professional golfer, member of World Golf Hall of Fame
 Fred Rogers, host of PBS series Mister Rogers' Neighborhood, lived in Latrobe from birth through high school. He is buried in Unity Cemetery.
 Eliza Kennedy Smith, also known as Mrs. R. Templeton Smith; suffragist, civic activist, and government watchdog, and president of the Allegheny County League of Women Voters
 Andy Stynchula, National Football League player
 Scott Warner, lighting designer and fixture development
 Boniface Wimmer, Benedictine monk, founded Saint Vincent Archabbey in 1846

See also 

 Greater Latrobe School District
 Kennametal
 Latrobe Athletic Association
 Latrobe Country Club
 Loyalhanna Creek
 Pittsburgh Metropolitan Area
 Saint Vincent Seminary
 Trump House
 WAOB Catholic Radio
 WCNS
 WXVE

References

External links 

 
 Greater Latrobe Community Network

 
Cities in Pennsylvania
Cities in Westmoreland County, Pennsylvania
Pittsburgh metropolitan area
1852 establishments in Pennsylvania
Populated places established in 1852